Allan Brown (born 21 December 1984 in Johannesburg) is a South African-born Canadian soccer player, currently without a club.

Career

College and Amateur
Allan moved from his native South Africa to Canada as a child, settling with his family in Newmarket, Ontario. He attended Sacred Heart Catholic High School, and subsequently played college soccer at Robert Morris University, where he majored in management and was an NEC All-Conference and Regional All-American performer.

Professional
Brown turned professional in 2008, playing with the Pittsburgh Riverhounds in the USL Second Division.

Personal
Despite being born in South Africa, Brown is now a Canadian citizen.

External links
Riverhounds bio

References

Robert Morris Colonials men's soccer players
1984 births
Living people
Canadian soccer players
Pittsburgh Riverhounds SC players
Association football defenders